This is a list of crossings of the Los Angeles River. Crossings are listed from south to north; that is, going upstream from the mouth of the river channel in Long Beach.

List

Gallery of aerial views of multiple bridges

See also

References

External links

 DOT.ca.gov: City of Los Angeles Monumental Bridges, 1900-1950
 Historic American Buildings Survey: Bridges of the Los Angeles River

.
.
Los Angeles River crossings
Los Angeles River
Los Angeles River bridges